Anna Vissi is the name of a self-titled album by Greek singer Anna Vissi. It is the first album with lifelong collaborator and companion Nikos Karvelas, who is credited under the alias "Nikos Leonardos". It was released in Greece and Cyprus in 1981 by EMI Greece. The album includes both original songs as well as several Greek covers of international hits. The album reached gold status.

Release
The album was repackaged with the same cover in 1982 to include the bonus song "Mono I Agapi", which was the Cypriot entry for the 1982 Eurovision Song Contest sung by Vissi.

The album appeared on compact disc for the first time in 2006 with the Minos EMI remastered edition named 4, since it was her fourth album. The re-release was prompted, once again, by Vissi's participation in Eurovision, this time for her entry in the 2006 Eurovision Song Contest. Previously the hit singles and other tracks of the album were available in CD format only via various compilations by Minos EMI. The 1982 Eurovision entry "Mono I Agapi" was also made available on CD in the CD single "Autostop/Mono I Agapi" released in February 2006.

All songs from the album were included in 2007 Anna Vissi box set Back to Time (Complete EMI Years) which charted on the Greek Albums Chart.

Music
Composition is by Nikos Leonardos (Nikos Karvelas), Anna Vissi, and Afoi Tzavara. Lyrics are by Giannis Parios, Nikos Leonardos, and Anna Vissi.

Track listing

Original edition
 "Ine Kati Stigmes" (There are moments)
 "Poso Sagapo" (How much I love you)
 "Horis Esena Ego Den Kano" (I don't do without you)
 "Thelo Mono Esena" (I only want you)
 "Ksehase Me" (Forget me)
 "Ma Itan Psemmata" (It was a lie)
 "Tha Mporousa" (I could)
 "Ela Na Zisoume" (Lets live)
 "Hanome" (I get lost)
 "Ta Matia Ta Dika Mou" (My eyes)
 "Se Lipame" (I feel sorry for you)
 "Kalimera Kenourgia Agapi" (Good morning my new love)

1982 Re-release
 "Mono I Agapi" (ESC 1982 Cypriot entry) (Only love)
 "Ine Kati Stigmes"
 "Poso Sagapo"
 "Horis Esena Ego Den Kano"
 "Thelo Mono Esena"
 "Ma Itan Psemmata"
 "Tha Mporousa"
 "Ela Na Zisoume"
 "Hanome"
 "Ta Matia Ta Dika Mou"
 "Se Lipame"
 "Kalimera Kenourgia Agapi"

2006 remastered edition: "4"
 "Ine Kati Stigmes"
 "Poso Sagapo"
 "Horis Esena Ego Den Kano"
 "Thelo Mono Esena"
 "Ksehase Me"
 "Ma Itan Psemmata"
 "Tha Mporousa"
 "Ela Na Zisoume"
 "Hanome"
 "Ta Matia Ta Dika Mou"
 "Se Lipame"
 "Kalimera Kenourgia Agapi"
 "Mono I Agapi" (ESC 1982 Cypriot entry)

Credits and personnel

Personnel
Charles Aznavour - music 
Sergio Bardotti - music 
Nikos Karvelas (alias: Nikos Leonardos) - music, lyrics
Yiannis Parios - lyrics 
Jacques Plante - music 
Norman David Shapiro - music 
Giorgos Tzavaras - music
Nikos Tzavaras - music
Anna Vissi - vocals, lyrics

Production
Kostas Fasolas - production management, recording engineering at Studio ERA
Kostas Klavas - arrangements, instrumentation, orchestral conduction

Design
Alinda Mavrogenis - photos

Credits adapted from the album's liner notes.

Release history

References

Anna Vissi albums
1981 albums
Greek-language albums
Minos EMI albums